Mgla is a rural locality (a selo) in Zapolyarny District of Nenets Autonomous Okrug, Russia. Mgla had a population of 20 people as of 2010, a decrease from a population of 33 in 2002.

Geography

Mgla is located in the southern portions of the Kanin Peninsula. The village is on the coast of the White Sea.

Rural localities in Nenets Autonomous Okrug

References